is a Japanese former professional footballer who played as a forward. He made 17 appearances for the Japan national team scoring three goals.

Club career
Ozaki was born in Tokyo on March 7, 1960. After graduating from high school, he joined Mitsubishi Motors in 1978. In 1978, the club won all three major title in Japan; Japan Soccer League, JSL Cup and Emperor's Cup. The club also won 1980 Emperor's Cup, 1981 JSL Cup and 1982 Japan Soccer League. He was also selected Japanese Footballer of the Year awards in 1982.

In July 1983, Ozaki moved to Germany and joined Arminia Bielefeld. He was the second Japanese to play in the Bundesliga after Yasuhiko Okudera. In 1985, Arminia Bielefeld was relegated to 2. Bundesliga. From 1988, he played at FC St. Pauli (1988–89) and TuRU Düsseldorf (1989–90).

In 1990, Ozaki returned to Japan and joined Mitsubishi Motors (later Urawa Reds). He moved to Verdy Kawasaki in 1993. He retired in 1994.

International career
In August 1979, Ozaki was selected Japan U-20 national team for 1979 World Youth Championship. He played in three matches as captain. On February 8, 1981, he debuted for Japan national team against Malaysia. He played at 1982 Asian Games. He played 17 games and scored 3 goals for Japan until 1983. After he moved to Germany in 1983, he was not selected Japan.

Career statistics

Club

International

References

External links
 
 
 Japan National Football Team Database
 
 
 

1960 births
Living people
Association football people from Tokyo
Japanese footballers
Association football forwards
Japan youth international footballers
Japan international footballers
Japan Soccer League players
J1 League players
Bundesliga players
2. Bundesliga players
Urawa Red Diamonds players
Arminia Bielefeld players
FC St. Pauli players
TuRU Düsseldorf players
Tokyo Verdy players
Footballers at the 1982 Asian Games
Asian Games competitors for Japan
Japanese expatriate footballers
Japanese expatriate sportspeople in Germany
Expatriate footballers in Germany